Events in the year 1093 in Norway.

Incumbents
 Monarch - Olaf III, Magnus Barefoot

Events
Magnus Barefoot invades Scotland. The reason was to help the Scottish king Donald Bane to conquer Edinburgh and the Scottish throne.

Arts and literature

Births

Deaths
22 September – Olaf III of Norway, king (born c. 1050).

References

Norway